Osirus Mitchell (born September 15, 1998) is an American football wide receiver who is a free agent. He played college football at Mississippi State. He signed with the Dallas Cowboys of the National Football League (NFL) as an undrafted free agent following the 2021 NFL Draft. He had stints with the Green Bay Packers, Birmingham Stallions of the United States Football League (USFL), and the Houston Roughnecks of the XFL. While with the Stallions he was a USFL champion.

Early life and high school
Mitchell grew up Sarasota, Florida, and attended Booker High School. As a senior, he averaged 21.7 yards per catch and had 25 touchdown receptions. Mitchell was rated a three-star recruit but was not recruited heavily initially, as he was not expected to qualify academically to play college football. However, he was able to graduate from high school in the summer after his senior year. He signed to play at Mississippi State in June going into his first year over offers from Texas a&m, Tennessee, South Florida, Minnesota, Central Florida, Wake Forest and Illinois.

College career
Mitchell redshirted his true freshman season. He played in nine games and caught five passes for 51 yards in his redshirt freshman season. As a redshirt sophomore, Mitchell led the team with 26 receptions for 427 yards and four touchdowns. Mitchell led the Bulldogs with 430 receiving yards and six touchdown receptions in his redshirt junior season.

Mitchell caught seven passes 183 yards in two touchdowns in a 44–34 victory in the first game of his redshirt senior over the defending national champion, LSU. He finished the season with 47 receptions for 505 yards and four touchdowns.

Professional career

Dallas Cowboys
Mitchell signed with the Dallas Cowboys as an undrafted free agent on May 14, 2021. He was waived on August 31, 2021, and re-signed to the practice squad the next day. He was released on December 20.

Birmingham Stallions
Mitchell was selected in the 15th round of the 2022 USFL Draft by the Birmingham Stallions. He was named a starter at wide receiver, making 23 receptions for 333 yards and 3 touchdowns. His 4 catches for 64 yards and a receiving touchdown against the New Orleans Breakers in the playoffs, helped propel the Stallions to a victory.

Green Bay Packers
On July 26, 2022, Mitchell signed with the Green Bay Packers. On August 10, 2022, the Green Bay Packers released Mitchell. He was placed on injured reserve the next day. On September 19, 2022, Mitchell was waived from injured reserve with an injury settlement.

Houston Roughnecks 
On February 1, 2023, Mitchell signed with the Houston Roughnecks of the XFL. On February 11, 2023, Mitchell was released during final roster cuts.

References

External links
Green Bay Packers bio
Mississippi State Bulldogs bio

Living people
1997 births
American football wide receivers
Players of American football from Florida
Mississippi State Bulldogs football players
Sportspeople from Sarasota, Florida
Dallas Cowboys players
Birmingham Stallions (2022) players
Green Bay Packers players